Ust-Pinega is a rural locality (a settlement) in Ust-Pinezhskoye Rural Settlement, Kholmogorsky District, Arkhangelsk Oblast, Russia. The population was 1,019 as of 2012. There are 10 streets.

Geography 
Ust-Pinega is located 23 km southeast of Kholmogory (the district's administrative centre) by road. Varda is the nearest rural locality.

References 

Rural localities in Kholmogorsky District